The Anshun Bridge is a bridge in the provincial capital of Chengdu in Sichuan, China. It crosses the Jin River. The covered bridge contains a relatively large restaurant and is a popular eating location in the city.

History
The original Anshun Bridge was constructed in 1746 by Lingan Hongdui along the Jin River. In 1947, a flood ravaged the city and destroyed the original bridge.

The bridge was constructed in 2003 as a replacement of the old bridge which was destroyed by a flood in the 1980s.

In the 13th century, Marco Polo wrote about several bridges in China and the Anshun Bridge (an earlier version of it) was one of them.

Gallery

References

Buildings and structures in Chengdu
Transport in Sichuan
Covered bridges in China
Bridges with buildings
Bridges completed in 2003
Footbridges
Tourist attractions in Chengdu